Barry Graeme Ashworth (born 23 September 1949) is a former New Zealand rugby union player. A loose forward, Ashworth represented Auckland at a provincial level, and was a member of the New Zealand national side, the All Blacks, in 1978. He played seven matches for the All Blacks including two internationals.

References

1949 births
Living people
People from Waiuku
People educated at Otahuhu College
New Zealand rugby union players
New Zealand international rugby union players
Auckland rugby union players
Rugby union flankers
Rugby union players from the Auckland Region